Swinging at the Castle (Det svänger på slottet) is a 1959 Swedish comedy film directed by Alf Kjellin and starring Alice Babs,Sven Lindberg, Lars Lönndahl and Yvonne Lombard. It was shot at the Råsunda Studios in Stockholm. The film's sets were designed by the art director P.A. Lundgren.

Cast
Alice Babs as Inga 'Trollet' Larsson
Sven Lindberg as Svante Lamander
Lars Lönndahl as Kurre Ström
Yvonne Lombard as  Sophie Gesping
Gunnar Björnstrand as Agne C:son Stressberg
Simon Brehm as Simon
Hjördis Petterson as Madame Rochelle
Sif Ruud as Mrs. Brick
Little Gerhard as himself

External links

1959 films
1950s Swedish-language films
Swedish comedy films
1959 comedy films
Films directed by Alf Kjellin
1950s Swedish films